The 2018 Oceania Judo Championships was not the ninth but the thirty second edition of the Oceania Judo Championships, organised by the Oceania Judo Union. It took place in Nouméa, New Caledonia from 6–8 April 2018.

Medal overview

Men

Women

Medal table

Participating nations
There was a total of 59 participants from 11 nations.

References

External links
 
 Oceania Judo Union website

Oceania
Oceanian Judo Championships
International sports competitions hosted by New Caledonia
Judo
Sports competitions in Nouméa
Oceanian championships
21st century in Nouméa